Glenea angerona is a species of beetle in the family Cerambycidae. It was described by James Thomson in 1865. It is known from Sumatra and Java. It contains the varietas Glenea angerona var. niasensis.

References

angerona
Beetles described in 1865